A culverin was initially an ancestor of the hand-held arquebus, but later was used to describe a type of medieval and Renaissance cannon.  The term is derived from the French "couleuvrine" (from couleuvre "grass snake", following the Latin colubrinus "of the nature of a snake".)  From its origin as a hand-held weapon it was adapted for use as artillery by the French in the 15th century, and for naval use by the English in the 16th century. The culverin as an artillery piece had a long smoothbore barrel with a relatively long range and flat trajectory, using solid round shot projectiles with high muzzle velocity.

Hand culverins 

The hand culverin consisted of a simple smoothbore metal tube, closed at one end except for a small touch hole designed to allow ignition of the gunpowder. The tube was attached to a wood or metal extension which could be held under the arm. It was loaded with gunpowder and lead bullets and fired by inserting a burning slow match into the touch hole.

James IV of Scotland was an enthusiastic user of hand culverins in 1508. He held shooting matches in the great halls of Holyrood Palace and Stirling Castle, took a culverin to stalk deer in the park of Falkland Palace, and shot at sea birds from a row boat off the Isle of May with his culverin.

This weapon was designed to use removable mug-shaped chambers which were prefilled with gunpowder and projectiles to speed up reloading. Breech-loading swivel guns were often used on ships against enemy crew or boarders.

Field culverins

Three types of culverin artillery pieces were used, distinguished by their size: the "culverin extraordinary", the "ordinary", and the "least-sized".

There were also smaller versions, including the "bastard culverin",  shot and the "demi-culverin" or "culverin-moyen",  shot.

Overall, the culverin was a significant advance over earlier cannons.  Since it fired iron round shot instead of stone projectiles and had a longer barrel to enable the gunpowder to fully burn and impart more force to the projectile, the culverin could fire the denser projectile to a relatively greater range and with a flatter trajectory. A replica culverin extraordinary has achieved a muzzle velocity of 408 m/s, and a range over  using only minimal elevation. This velocity and mass imply that the cannonball had a kinetic energy of roughly   when leaving the muzzle.

In Britain, Brigadier General Michael Richards was appointed Master-General of the Ordnance in 1714 and he commissioned a Danish expert, Albert Borgard, to design a new artillery system. Borgard did away with the traditional nomenclature of culverins, sakers and minions, and devised a new system based on the weight of shot that each gun used, from 4 to 64 pounds. Although Borgard's gun designs were quickly superseded, the practice of naming ordnance by weight of shot persisted in Britain into the 20th century.

See also
Arquebus
Demi-culverin
Doglock
Flintlock
Hand cannon
Matchlock
Miquelet
Musket
Pistol
Snaphance
Snaplock
Wheellock

References

External links 

 "Culverin (cannon)" at the Encyclopædia Britannica
 Specifications and pictures of a French culverin found in the Azores

Cannon
Medieval artillery
Muskets
Renaissance-era weapons